Clark Quarry is a paleontological dig site in southern Georgia. The site first discovered fossils by the building of the Brunswick Canal in 1838-1839.

Geology 
Clark Quarry is a cut and fill fluvial deposit overlying a marine sand, near Brunswick, Georgia, United States in Glynn County. The marine unit is characterized by a well-sorted, subrounded, low sphericity, fine- grained quartz arenite representing sediments of the Princess Anne Terrace. This site is in the pleistocene era on the geologic timescale.

Fossils 

Woodchuck–Marmota monax
Bog lemming–Synaptomys cooperi
Capybara–Hydrochoeris holmesi
Florida or round-tailed muskrat–Neofiber alleni
Rice rat–Oryzomys palustris
Cotton rat–Sigmodon hispidus
Harvest mouse–Reithrodontomys
Columbian Mammoth-Mammuthus columbi
Pleistocene Bison-Bison latifrons
American Alligator-Alligator mississippiensis
Nerodia sp
Garter Snake-Thamnophis sp
Giant Ground Sloth-Megatherium
Mastodon-Mastodon giganteum
Horse-Equus ferus
White-tail deer-Odocoileus virginianus

References

External links 
Georgia College & State University Department of Biological & Environmental Sciences Natural History Collections Retrieved 12 March 2011
Amphiuma (Caudata: Amphiumidae) from the Pleistocene Clark Quarry local fauna of coastal Georgia Retrieved 12 March 2011

Geography of Glynn County, Georgia
Mines in Georgia (U.S. state)
Archaeological sites in Georgia (U.S. state)